Minju may refer to:

Min opera, a Chinese opera genre from Fujian
Minju Party (disambiguation), Korean political parties
Min-ju, Korean given name